"Love Is the Law" is the debut single of Britpop band the Seahorses, released as the first single from their only studio album, Do It Yourself (1997). Written by ex-Stone Roses guitarist John Squire, the song contains a lengthy guitar solo at the end that was edited out for a single release. The cover artwork features a painting by Squire, also called Love Is the Law, that he created in 1996.

"Love Is the Law" is the Seahorses' biggest hit and their only song to gain popularity outside the United Kingdom. It debuted and peaked at number three on the UK Singles Chart in May 1997 and topped the Scottish Singles Chart the same week. The song also reached number 11 in Ireland and number 38 in Sweden. Outside Europe, "Love Is the Law" received some airplay on North American radio, and its music video aired on MTV and VH1. This exposure allowed the song to reach number three on the Canadian RPM Alternative 30 chart.

Track listings
UK, Japanese, and Australian CD single
 "Love Is the Law" – 3:42
 "Dreamer" – 3:31
 "Sale of the Century" – 3:50

UK 7-inch single
A. "Love Is the Law" – 3:42
B. "Dreamer" – 3:31

Credits and personnel
Credits are taken from the UK 7-inch single sleeve and the Do It Yourself album booklet.

Studios
 Recorded and mixed at Royaltone Studios (North Hollywood, California)
 Mastered at Gateway Mastering (Portland, Maine, US)

Personnel
 John Squire – writing, artwork painting (1996)
 Tony Visconti – production
 Rob Jacobs – recording, mixing
 Jeff Thomas – assistant engineer
 Bob Ludwig – mastering
 Matt Squire – photography

Charts

Weekly charts

Year-end charts

Release history

References

1997 debut singles
1997 songs
Geffen Records singles
Number-one singles in Scotland
Song recordings produced by Tony Visconti
Songs written by John Squire
The Seahorses songs